The 2022 New York Yankees season was the 120th season for the New York Yankees franchise.

On December 2, 2021, Commissioner of Baseball Rob Manfred announced a lockout of players, following expiration of the collective bargaining agreement (CBA) between the league and the Major League Baseball Players Association (MLBPA). On March 10, 2022, the MLB and MLBPA agreed to a new collective bargaining agreement, thus ending the lockout. Although MLB previously announced that several series would be cancelled due to the lockout, the agreement provides for a 162-game season, with originally canceled games to be made up via doubleheaders. Opening Day was at the time scheduled for April 7, but was postponed due to inclement weather.

Starting with the 2022 season, the Yankees local television broadcast was split between the YES Network (which this season marked its 20th foundation anniversary) and Amazon Prime Video, leaving the Yankees without a local over-the-air broadcaster, save for national games. This was the first time the Yankees were without a local OTA broadcaster since 1946 as they would partner with WABD-TV (now WNYW Fox 5) the following season. Also, it was notable for being the pearl jubilee season for the long time Yankee broadcaster Michael Kay, who joined the team in 1992.

From May 24 to June 23, the Yankees won 15 straight games at home, a feat last accomplished by the team in the 1961 season. On June 25, the Yankees lost a combined no-hitter by the Houston Astros, the first time the Yankees were no hit since the Astros threw another combined no-hitter in the old Yankee Stadium on June 11, 2003.

On August 21, the Yankees retired Paul O'Neill's No. 21 on "Paul O'Neill Day". He also received a plaque, which is immortalized in Monument Park at Yankee Stadium. O'Neill became the 23rd player (or manager) in the franchise's history to be honored.

The Yankees were 64–28 in the first half of the season leading to the All-Star Game before going 35–35 to in the second half, failing to win 100 games after being on track for it in June. Despite their struggles in the second half of the season, the Yankees clinched their 30th straight winning season, dating back to 1993, with a win against the Twins on September 7.

On September 22, the Yankees clinched a postseason spot with a walk-off 5–4 win against the Red Sox. On October 4, Aaron Judge hit his 62nd home run, breaking the American League single-season home run record set in 1961 by Roger Maris.

The Yankees won the American League East and defeated the Cleveland Guardians in the Division Series in five games. The Yankees fell to the eventual World Series champion Houston Astros in the Championship Series in a four-game sweep, the first sweep in a best-of-seven series since the 2012 ALCS.

The Yankees became the Rawlings Gold Glove Award Team winners. After Rawlings introduced the team award in 2020, the Yankees are only the third team to receive the award after the Cleveland Guardians in 2020 and the Houston Astros in 2021. Two Yankees players were awarded Gold Gloves this season; utility man DJ LeMahieu, and catcher Jose Trevino, who also won the Platinum Glove Award for the 2022 season.

Offseason

Lockout 

The expiration of the league's collective bargaining agreement (CBA) with the Major League Baseball Players Association occurred on December 1, 2021 with no new agreement in place. As a result, the team owners voted unanimously to lockout the players stopping all free agency and trades. 

The parties came to an agreement on a new CBA on March 10, 2022.

Rule changes 
Pursuant to the new CBA, several new rules were instituted for the 2022 season. The National League adopted the designated hitter full-time, a draft lottery was implemented, the postseason expanded from ten teams to twelve (regular season tie-breakers will be abolished, to compensate), and advertising patches appeared on player uniforms and helmets for the first time.

Transactions

2021

November 10 – Joely Rodriguez re-signs with the Yankees for a 1-year, $2 million contract in free agency.
November 19 – Acquired first baseman T.J. Rumfield and left-handed pitcher Joel Valdez from the Philadelphia Phillies for right-handed pitcher Nick Nelson and catcher Donny Sands.
November 30 – Gio Urshela re-signs with the Yankees to a 1-year, $6.55 million contract. Domingo German re-signs with the Yankees to 1-year, $1.75 million and Lucas Luetge to 1-year, $905,000 contract.

2022
March 13 – Signed outfielder Tim Locastro to a one-year Major League contract.
March 13 – Acquired third baseman Josh Donaldson, short stop Isiah Kiner-Falefa and catcher Ben Rortvedt from the Minnesota Twins in exchange for Gary Sánchez and Gio Urshela. The Yankees take on Donaldson's $50 million contract, the projected $4.9 million for Kiner-Falefa's salary, and Rortvedt's minimum salary.
March 15 – Re-signed first baseman Anthony Rizzo to a two-year, $32 million deal with an opt out after the first year.
March 18 – Acquired pitching prospect Justin Lang from the San Diego Padres in exchange for Luke Voit.
April 2 – Acquired catcher Jose Trevino from the Texas Rangers in exchange for right-handed pitcher Albert Abreu and left-handed pitcher Robert Ahlstrom.
April 3 – Acquired right-handed reliever Miguel Castro from the New York Mets in exchange for left-handed reliever Joely Rodríguez.
April 4 – Acquired right-handed reliever David McKay from the Tampa Bay Rays in exchange for cash.
April 4 – Signed second baseman Derek Dietrich to a minor league contract.
April 6 – Signed first baseman Greg Bird to a minor league contract.

Regular season

Transactions
April 19 – Signed third baseman Kaleb Cowart to a minor league contract.
May 13 – Signed right-handed starting pitcher Danny Salazar to a minor league contract.
May 26 – Signed right-handed relief pitcher Shane Greene to a minor league contract.
May 26 – Signed infielder Matt Carpenter to a major league contract from the Texas Rangers organization for a $1 million, 1-year deal.
May 29 – Re-signed catcher Rob Brantly to a minor league contract.
June 3 – Acquired first baseman and designated hitter Jake Bauers from the Cincinnati Reds in exchange for cash.
June 24 – Re-signed Aaron Judge to a one-year, $19 million contract with additional $250,000 bonuses for winning each of the AL MVP Award and the World Series MVP Award.
July 28 – Acquired outfielder Andrew Benintendi from the Kansas City Royals in exchange for minor league pitchers Chandler Champlain, Beck Way, and TJ Sikkema.
August 1 – Acquired right-handed reliever Scott Effross from the Chicago Cubs in exchange for minor league right-hand pitcher Hayden Wesneski.
August 1 – Acquired right-handed starting pitcher Frankie Montas and right-handed relief pitcher Lou Trivino from the Oakland Athletics in exchange for minor league left-handed pitchers Ken Waldichuk and JP Sears, right-handed pitcher Luis Medina, and second baseman Cooper Bowman.
August 2 – Traded Joey Gallo to the Los Angeles Dodgers for minor league pitching prospect Clayton Beeter.
August 2 – Acquired outfielder Harrison Bader with a player to be named later or cash considerations from the St. Louis Cardinals in exchange for left-handed starting pitcher Jordan Montgomery.
August 28 – Signed left-handed pitcher Anthony Banda who opted out of his contract with the Seattle Mariners.

Season standings

American League East

American League Playoffs

Game log

 
|- style="background:#bfb;" 
| 1 || April 8 || Red Sox || 6–5  || King (1–0) || Crawford (0–1) || — || Yankee Stadium || 46,097 || 1–0
|- style="background:#bfb;" 
| 2 || April 9 || Red Sox || 4–2 || Luetge (1–0) || Pivetta (0–1) || Chapman (1) || Yankee Stadium || 46,882 || 2–0
|- style="background:#fbb;" 
| 3 || April 10 || Red Sox || 3–4 || Crawford (1–1) || Schmidt (0–1) || Diekman (1) || Yankee Stadium || 40,108 || 2–1
|- style="background:#fbb;"
| 4 || April 11 || Blue Jays || 0–3 || Manoah (1–0) || Taillon (0–1) || Romano (3) || Yankee Stadium || 26,211 || 2–2
|- style="background:#bfb;" 
| 5 || April 12 || Blue Jays || 4–0 || Holmes (1–0) || Kikuchi (0–1) || — || Yankee Stadium || 25,068 || 3–2
|- style="background:#fbb;" 
| 6 || April 13 || Blue Jays || 4–6 || Cimber (2–0) || Green (0–1) || Romano (4) || Yankee Stadium || 30,109 || 3–3
|- style="background:#bfb;" 
| 7 || April 14 || Blue Jays || 3–0 || Severino (1–0) || Gausman (0–1) || King (1) || Yankee Stadium || 37,255 || 4–3
|- style="background:#fbb;"
| 8 || April 15 || @ Orioles || 1–2  || Krehbiel (1–0) || Schmidt (0–2) || — || Camden Yards || 32,197 || 4–4
|- style="background:#bfb;" 
| 9 || April 16 || @ Orioles || 5–2 || Sears (1–0) || Lakins Sr. (0–1) || Holmes (1) || Camden Yards || 28,179 || 5–4
|- style="background:#fbb;" 
| 10 || April 17 || @ Orioles || 0–5 || López (1–1) || Loáisiga (0–1) || — || Camden Yards || 25,938 || 5–5
|- style="background:#bfb;" 
| 11 || April 19 || @ Tigers || 4–2 || Schmidt (1–2) || Alexander (0–1) || Chapman (2) || Comerica Park || 15,498 || 6–5
|- style="background:#bfb;" 
| 12 || April 20 || @ Tigers || 5–3 || Green (1–1) || Hutchison (0–1) || Chapman (3) || Comerica Park || 17,268 || 7–5
|- style="background:#fbb;" 
| 13 || April 21 || @ Tigers || 0–3 || Pineda (1–0) || Montgomery (0–1) || Soto (3) || Comerica Park || 21,529 || 7–6
|- style="background:#bfb;" 
| 14 || April 22 || Guardians || 4–1 || Taillon (1–1) || Morgan (1–1) || Chapman (4) || Yankee Stadium || 41,062 || 8–6
|- style="background:#bfb;" 
| 15 || April 23 || Guardians || 5–4 || Castro (1–0) || Clase (0–2) || — || Yankee Stadium || 39,180 || 9–6
|- style="background:#bfb;" 
| 16 || April 24 || Guardians || 10–2 || Cole (1–0) || Civale (0–2) || — || Yankee Stadium || 39,050 || 10–6
|- style="background:#bfb;" 
| 17 || April 26 || Orioles || 12–8 || Severino (2–0) || Lyles (1–2) || — || Yankee Stadium || 28,596 || 11–6
|- style="background:#bfb;" 
| 18 || April 27 || Orioles || 5–2 || King (2–0) || Krehbiel (1–2) || Holmes (2) || Yankee Stadium || 31,122 || 12–6
|- style="background:#bfb;" 
| 19 || April 28 || Orioles || 10–5 || Castro (2–0) || Zimmermann (1–1) || — || Yankee Stadium || 29,268 || 13–6
|- style="background:#bfb;" 
| 20 || April 29 || @ Royals || 12–2  || Cortés Jr. (1–0) || Bubic (0–2) || — || Kauffman Stadium || 16,460 || 14–6
|- style="background:#bfb;" 
| 21 || April 30 || @ Royals || 3–0 || Cole (2–0) || Hernández (0–1) || Chapman (5) || Kauffman Stadium || 23,965 || 15–6
|-

 
|- style="background:#bfb;" 
| 22 || May 1 || @ Royals || 6–4 || Schmidt (2–2) || Coleman (0–1) || Chapman (6) || Kauffman Stadium || 19,704 || 16–6
|- style="background:#bfb;" 
| 23 || May 2 || @ Blue Jays || 3–2 || Holmes (2–0) || García (0–2) || Green (1) || Rogers Centre || 18,577 || 17–6
|- style="background:#bfb;" 
| 24 || May 3 || @ Blue Jays || 9–1 || Taillon (2–1) || Cimber (4–1) || — || Rogers Centre || 22,491 || 18–6
|- style="background:#fbb;" 
| 25 || May 4 || @ Blue Jays || 1–2 || Kikuchi (1–1) || Cortés Jr. (1–1) || Romano (12) || Rogers Centre || 29,057 || 18–7
|- style="background:#bfb;" 
| 26 || May 8 || Rangers || 2–1 || Holmes (3–0) || King (1–1) || — || Yankee Stadium ||  || 19–7
|- style="background:#fbb;" 
| 27 || May 8 || Rangers || 2–4 || Richards (1–1) || King (2–1) || Barlow (4) || Yankee Stadium || 40,714 || 19–8
|- style="background:#bfb;" 
| 28 || May 9 || Rangers || 1–0 || Holmes (4–0) || Martin (0–3) || Chapman (7) || Yankee Stadium || 34,866 || 20–8
|- style="background:#bfb;" 
| 29 || May 10 || Blue Jays || 6–5 || Peralta (1–0) || Romano (1–2) || — || Yankee Stadium || 41,522 || 21–8
|- style="background:#bfb;" 
| 30 || May 11 || Blue Jays || 5–3 || Taillon (3–1) || Berríos (2–2) || Chapman (8) || Yankee Stadium || 42,105 || 22–8
|- style="background:#bfb;" 
| 31 || May 12 || @ White Sox || 15–7 || Loáisiga (1–1) || Kelly (0–1) || — || Guaranteed Rate Field || 20,050 || 23–8
|- style="background:#bfb;" 
| 32 || May 13 || @ White Sox || 10–4 || Cole (3–0) || Velasquez (2–3) || — || Guaranteed Rate Field || 28,877 || 24–8
|- style="background:#fbb;" 
| 33 || May 14 || @ White Sox || 2–3 || Hendriks (1–2) || Chapman (0–1) || — || Guaranteed Rate Field || 32,830 || 24–9
|- style="background:#bfb;" 
| 34 || May 15 || @ White Sox || 5–1 || Cortés Jr. (2–1) || Kopech (0–1) || — || Guaranteed Rate Field || 29,500 || 25–9
|- style="background:#bfb;" 
| 35 || May 16 || @ Orioles || 6–2 || Severino (3–0) || Bradish (1–2) || — || Camden Yards || 12,228 || 26–9
|- style="background:#bfb;" 
| 36 || May 17 || @ Orioles || 5–4 || Taillon (4–1) || Tate (0–2) || Chapman (9) || Camden Yards || 12,635 || 27–9
|- style="background:#bfb;"
| 37 || May 18 || @ Orioles || 3–2 || Cole (4–0) || Lyles (2–4) || Holmes (3) || Camden Yards || 13,850 || 28–9
|- style="background:#fbb;" 
| 38 || May 19 || @ Orioles || 6–9 || Bautista (1–1) || Luetge (1–1) || — || Camden Yards || 23,819 || 28–10
|- style="background:#bbb;" 
| — || May 20 || White Sox || colspan=7 | Postponed (rain); Makeup: May 22
|- style="background:#bfb;" 
| 39 || May 21 || White Sox || 7–5 || Cortés Jr. (3–1) || Keuchel (2–4) || Holmes (4) || Yankee Stadium || 44,001 || 29–10
|- style="background:#fbb;" 
| 40 || May 22  || White Sox || 1–3 || Graveman (1–1) || Chapman (0–2) || Hendriks (13) || Yankee Stadium ||  || 29–11
|- style="background:#fbb;" 
| 41 || May 22  || White Sox || 0–5 || Kopech (1–1) || Loáisiga (1–2) || — || Yankee Stadium || 36,167 || 29–12
|- style="background:#fbb;" 
| 42 || May 23 || Orioles || 4–6 || Lyles (3–4) || Cole (4–1) || López (5) || Yankee Stadium || 32,187 || 29–13
|- style="background:#bfb;" 
| 43 || May 24 || Orioles || 7–6  || Schmidt (3–2) || Baker (1–2) || — || Yankee Stadium || 32,289 || 30–13
|- style="background:#bfb;" 
| 44 || May 25 || Orioles || 2–0 || Sears (2–0) || Wells (1–4) || Holmes (5) || Yankee Stadium || 39,154 || 31–13
|- style="background:#bfb;" 
| 45 || May 26 || @ Rays || 7–2 || Cortés Jr. (4–1) || Yarbrough (0–1) || — || Tropicana Field || 14,610 || 32–13
|- style="background:#bfb;" 
| 46 || May 27 || @ Rays || 2–0 || Taillon (5–1) || Springs (2–2) || Holmes (6) || Tropicana Field || 19,018 || 33–13
|- style="background:#fbb;" 
| 47 || May 28 || @ Rays || 1–3 || Feyereisen (4–0) || Luetge (1–2) || Poche (2) || Tropicana Field || 25,025 || 33–14
|- style="background:#fbb;" 
| 48 || May 29 || @ Rays || 2–4 || McClanahan (5–2) || Severino (3–1) || Feyereisen (1) || Tropicana Field || 25,025 || 33–15
|- style="background:#bfb;" 
| 49 || May 31 || Angels || 9–1 || Montgomery (1–1) || Syndergaard (4–3) || — || Yankee Stadium || 31,242 || 34–15
|-

 
|- style="background:#bbb;" 
| — || June 1 || Angels || colspan=7 | Postponed (rain); Makeup: June 2
|- style="background:#bfb;" 
| 50 || June 2  || Angels || 6–1 || Cortés Jr. (5–1) || Ohtani (3–4) || Peralta (1) || Yankee Stadium || 30,518 || 35–15
|- style="background:#bfb;" 
| 51 || June 2  || Angels || 2–1 || Taillon (6–1) || Ortega (1–2) || Holmes (7) || Yankee Stadium || 33,476 || 36–15
|- style="background:#bfb;" 
| 52 || June 3 || Tigers || 13–0 || Cole (5–1) || Rodríguez (0–1) || — || Yankee Stadium || 42,026 || 37–15
|- style="background:#bfb;"
| 53 || June 4 || Tigers || 3–0 || Severino (4–1) || Brieske (0–5) || Holmes (8) || Yankee Stadium || 38,106 || 38–15
|- style="background:#bfb;"
| 54 || June 5 || Tigers || 5–4  || King (3–1) || Soto (2–3) || — || Yankee Stadium || 38,030 || 39–15
|- style="background:#bfb;"
| 55 || June 7 || @ Twins || 10–4 || Luetge (2–2) || Sands (0–2) || — || Target Field || 27,643 || 40–15
|- style="background:#fbb;" 
| 56 || June 8 || @ Twins || 1–8 || Archer (1–2) || Cortés Jr. (5–2) || — || Target Field || 22,286 || 40–16
|- style="background:#bfb;"
| 57 || June 9 || @ Twins || 10–7 || Castro (3–0) || Durán (0–2) || Holmes (9) || Target Field || 26,646 || 41–16
|- style="background:#bfb;"
| 58 || June 10 || Cubs || 2–1  || Marinaccio (1–0) || Mills (0–1) || — || Yankee Stadium || 43,446 || 42–16
|- style="background:#bfb;"
| 59 || June 11 || Cubs || 8–0 || Montgomery (2–1) || Swarmer (1–1) || — || Yankee Stadium || 38,043 || 43–16
|- style="background:#bfb;"
| 60 || June 12 || Cubs || 18–4 || Taillon (7–1) || Thompson (6–2) || Bañuelos (1) || Yankee Stadium || 39,114 || 44–16
|- style="background:#bfb;"
| 61 || June 14 || Rays || 2–0 || Cole (6–1) || Kluber (3–3) || Holmes (10) || Yankee Stadium || 35,692 || 45–16
|- style="background:#bfb;" 
| 62 || June 15 || Rays || 4–3 || Cortés Jr. (6–2) || McClanahan (7–3) || Holmes (11) || Yankee Stadium || 35,104 || 46–16
|- style="background:#bfb;" 
| 63 || June 16 || Rays || 2–1 || King (4–1) || Armstrong (0–1) || — || Yankee Stadium || 39,469 || 47–16
|- style="background:#bfb;" 
| 64 || June 17 || @ Blue Jays || 12–3 || Montgomery (3–1) || Stripling (3–2) || — || Rogers Centre || 44,688 || 48–16
|- style="background:#bfb;" 
| 65 || June 18 || @ Blue Jays || 4–0 || Taillon (8–1) || Manoah (8–2) || — || Rogers Centre || 45,055 || 49–16
|- style="background:#fbb;" 
| 66 || June 19 || @ Blue Jays || 9–10 || García (1–3) || Peralta (1–1) || Romano (17) || Rogers Centre || 44,395 || 49–17
|- style="background:#bfb;" 
| 67 || June 20 || @ Rays || 4–2 || Peralta (2-1) || Adam (0–2) || — || Tropicana Field || 16,504 || 50–17
|- style="background:#fbb;" 
| 68 || June 21 || @ Rays || 4–5 || Armstrong (1–1) || Cortés Jr. (6–3) || Poche (5) || Tropicana Field || 20,688 || 50–18
|- style="background:#bfb;" 
| 69 || June 22 || @ Rays || 5–4 || Schmidt (4–2) || Garza Jr. (0–2) || Holmes (12) || Tropicana Field || 12,264 || 51–18
|- style="background:#bfb;" 
| 70 || June 23 || Astros || 7–6 || Castro (4–0) || Pressly (1–2) || — || Yankee Stadium || 44,071 || 52–18
|- style="background:#fbb;" 
| 71 || June 24 || Astros || 1–3 || Verlander (9–3) || Severino (4–2) || Montero (5) || Yankee Stadium || 47,528 || 52–19
|- style="background:#fbb;"
| 72 || June 25 || Astros || 0–3 || Javier (5–3) || Cole (6–2) || Pressly (15) || Yankee Stadium || 45,076 || 52–20
|- style="background:#bfb;"
| 73 || June 26 || Astros || 6–3  || King (5–1) || Martinez (0–1) || — || Yankee Stadium || 44,028 || 53–20
|- style="background:#bfb;"
| 74 || June 27 || Athletics || 9–5 || Abreu (1–0) || Puk (1–1) || — || Yankee Stadium || 33,168 || 54–20
|- style="background:#bfb;"
| 75 || June 28 || Athletics || 2–1 || Sears (3–0) || Montas (3–8) || Holmes (13) || Yankee Stadium || 38,051 || 55–20
|- style="background:#bfb;" 
| 76 || June 29 || Athletics || 5–3 || Taillon (9–1) || Irvin (2–6) || Holmes (14) || Yankee Stadium || 39,647 || 56–20
|- style="background:#fbb;" 
| 77 || June 30 || @ Astros || 1–2 || Garcia (6–5) || Severino (4–3) || Pressly (17) || Minute Maid Park || 40,674 || 56–21
|-

 
|- style="background:#bbb;" 
| — || July 1 || @ Guardians || colspan=7| Postponed (inclement weather); Makeup July 2
|- style="background:#bfb;" 
| 78 || July 2  || @ Guardians || 13–4 || Cole (7–2) || McCarty (0–2) || — || Progressive Field || 21,203 || 57–21
|- style="background:#bfb;" 
| 79 || July 2  || @ Guardians || 6–1 || Cortés Jr. (7–3) || Civale (2–5) || Holmes (15) || Progressive Field || 29,236 || 58–21
|- style="background:#fbb;" 
| 80 || July 3 || @ Guardians || 0–2 || McKenzie (5–6) || Montgomery (3–2) || Clase (19) || Progressive Field || 26,113 || 58–22
|- style="background:#fbb;" 
| 81 || July 5 || @ Pirates || 2–5 || Quintana (2–4) || Taillon (9–2) || Bednar (13) || PNC Park || 37,733 || 58–23
|- style="background:#bfb;"
| 82 || July 6 || @ Pirates || 16–0 || Severino (5–3) || Keller (2–6) || — || PNC Park || 32,414 || 59–23
|- style="background:#bfb;"
| 83 || July 7 || @ Red Sox || 6–5 || Cole (8–2) || Winckowski (3–3) || Holmes (16) || Fenway Park || 36,876 || 60–23
|- style="background:#bfb;"
| 84 || July 8 || @ Red Sox || 12–5 || Castro (5–0) || Seabold (0–2) || Luetge (1) || Fenway Park || 36,841 || 61–23
|- style="background:#fbb;"
| 85 || July 9 || @ Red Sox || 5–6  || Diekman (4–0) || Peralta (2–2) || — || Fenway Park || 36,945 || 61–24
|- style="background:#fbb;"
| 86 || July 10 || @ Red Sox || 6–11 || Sawamura (1–1) || Chapman (0–3) || — || Fenway Park || 37,291 || 61–25
|- style="background:#fbb;"
| 87 || July 12 || Reds || 3–4 || Sanmartin (2–4) || Holmes (4–1) || Díaz (3) || Yankee Stadium || 40,235 || 61–26
|- style="background:#bfb;"
| 88 || July 13 || Reds || 7–6  || King (6–1) || Díaz (2–1) || — || Yankee Stadium || 36,772 || 62–26
|- style="background:#fbb;"
| 89 || July 14 || Reds || 6–7  || Sanmartin (3–4) || Luetge (2–3) || Moreta (1) || Yankee Stadium || 41,311 || 62–27
|- style="background:#fbb;"
| 90 || July 15 || Red Sox || 4–5  || Houck (5–3) || King (6–2) || Brasier (1) || Yankee Stadium || 47,572 || 62–28
|- style="background:#bfb;"
| 91 || July 16 || Red Sox || 14–1 || Taillon (10–2) || Pivetta (8–7) || Weber (1) || Yankee Stadium || 47,997 || 63–28
|- style="background:#bfb;"
| 92 || July 17 || Red Sox || 13–2 || Cole (9–2) || Sale (0–1) || — || Yankee Stadium || 47,958 || 64–28
|-style=background:#bff
|colspan="10"|92nd All-Star Game in Los Angeles, California
|- style="background:#fbb;"
| 93 || July 21  || @ Astros || 2–3 || Neris (3–3) || King (6–3) || — || Minute Maid Park || 36,225 || 64–29 
|- style="background:#fbb;"
| 94 || July 21  || @ Astros || 5–7 || García (8–5) || Germán (0–1) || Montero (7) || Minute Maid Park || 39,342 || 64–30
|- style="background:#bfb;"
| 95 || July 22 || @ Orioles || 7–6 || Luetge (3–3) || Wells (7–6) || Holmes (17) || Camden Yards || 28,468 || 65–30
|- style="background:#fbb;"
| 96 || July 23 || @ Orioles || 3–6 || Pérez (5–1) || Cole (9–3) || López (18) || Camden Yards || 36,361 || 65–31
|- style="background:#bfb;"
| 97 || July 24 || @ Orioles || 6–0 || Cortés Jr. (8–3) || Kremer (3–2) || Schmidt (1) || Camden Yards || 25,623 || 66–31
|- style="background:#fbb;" 
| 98 || July 26 || @ Mets || 3–6 || Walker (8–2) || Montgomery (3–3) || Díaz (22) || Citi Field || 42,364 || 66–32
|- style="background:#fbb;" 
| 99 || July 27 || @ Mets || 2–3 || Lugo (2–2) || Peralta (2–3) || — || Citi Field || 43,693 || 66–33
|- style="background:#bfb;" 
| 100 || July 28 || Royals || 1–0 || Holmes (5–1) || Barlow (4–3) || — || Yankee Stadium || 43,836 || 67–33
|- style="background:#bfb;" 
| 101 || July 29 || Royals || 11–5 || Abreu (2–0) || Barlow (4–4) || — || Yankee Stadium || 42,481 || 68–33
|- style="background:#bfb;" 
| 102 || July 30 || Royals || 8–2 || Cortés Jr. (9–3) || Heasley (1–6) || Schmidt (2) || Yankee Stadium || 44,081 || 69–33
|- style="background:#fbb;" 
| 103 || July 31 || Royals || 6–8 || Clarke (2–1) || Holmes (5–2) || — || Yankee Stadium || 45,341 || 69–34
|-

 
|- style="background:#bfb;"
| 104 || August 1 || Mariners || 7–2 || Germán (1–1) || Gonzales (6–11) || — || Yankee Stadium || 36,734 || 70–34
|- style="background:#fbb;"
| 105 || August 2 || Mariners || 6–8 || Murfee (2–0) || Luetge (3–4) || Muñoz (2) || Yankee Stadium || 38,735 || 70–35
|- style="background:#fbb;"
| 106 || August 3 || Mariners || 3–7 || Castillo (5–4) || Cole (9–4) || — || Yankee Stadium || 42,169 || 70–36
|- style="background:#fbb;" 
| 107 || August 5 || @ Cardinals || 3–4 || Pallante (5–4) || Holmes (5–3) || Helsley (10) || Busch Stadium || 46,940 || 70–37
|- style="background:#fbb;"
| 108 || August 6 || @ Cardinals || 0–1 || Montgomery (4–3) || Germán (1–2) || Gallegos (11) || Busch Stadium || 48,581 || 70–38
|- style="background:#fbb;"
| 109 || August 7 || @ Cardinals || 9–12 || Stratton (6–4) || Abreu (2–1) || Helsley (11) || Busch Stadium || 46,472 || 70–39
|- style="background:#bfb;"
| 110 || August 8 || @ Mariners || 9–4 || Taillon (11–2) || Gilbert (10–5) || — || T-Mobile Park || 35,843 || 71–39
|- style="background:#fbb;"
| 111 || August 9 || @ Mariners || 0–1  || Brash (3–3) || Loáisiga (1–3) || — || T-Mobile Park || 38,804 || 71–40
|- style="background:#fbb;"
| 112 || August 10 || @ Mariners || 3–4 || Murfee (3–0) || Abreu (2–2) || Sewald (15) || T-Mobile Park || 43,280 || 71–41
|- style="background:#fbb;"
| 113 || August 12 || @ Red Sox || 2–3  || Whitlock (3–2) || Trivino (1–7) || — || Fenway Park || 36,434 || 71–42
|- style="background:#bfb;"
| 114 || August 13 || @ Red Sox || 3–2 || Chapman (1–3) || Schreiber (3–2) || Effross (2) || Fenway Park || 36,672 || 72–42
|- style="background:#fbb;"
| 115 || August 14 || @ Red Sox || 0–3 || Wacha (7–1) || Taillon (11–3) || Whitlock (4) || Fenway Park || 36,581 || 72–43
|- style="background:#fbb;"
| 116 || August 15 || Rays || 0–4 || Yarbrough (1–7) || Cole (9–5) || — || Yankee Stadium || 42,192 || 72–44
|- style="background:#fbb;"
| 117 || August 16 || Rays || 1–3 || Springs (5–3) || Cortés Jr. (9–4) || Adam (7) || Yankee Stadium || 41,083 || 72–45
|- style="background:#bfb;"
| 118 || August 17 || Rays || 8–7  || Chapman (2–3) || Beeks (2–2) || — || Yankee Stadium || 42,512 || 73–45
|- style="background:#fbb;"
| 119 || August 18 || Blue Jays || 2–9 || Berríos (9–5) || Montas (4–10) || — || Yankee Stadium || 41,419 || 73–46
|- style="background:#fbb;"
| 120 || August 19 || Blue Jays || 0–4 || Gausman (9–9) || Taillon (11–4) || — || Yankee Stadium || 46,194 || 73–47
|- style="background:#fbb;"
| 121 || August 20 || Blue Jays || 2–5 || Cimber (9–4) || Cole (9–6) || García (1) || Yankee Stadium || 45,538 || 73–48
|- style="background:#bfb;"
| 122 || August 21 || Blue Jays || 4–2 || Trivino (2–7) || Cimber (9–5) || — || Yankee Stadium || 46,958 || 74–48
|- style="background:#bfb;"
| 123 || August 22 || Mets || 4–2 || Germán (2–2) || Scherzer (9–3) || Loáisiga (1) || Yankee Stadium || 48,760 || 75–48
|- style="background:#bfb;"
| 124 || August 23 || Mets || 4–2 || Schmidt (5–2) || Rodríguez (0–3) || Peralta (2) || Yankee Stadium || 49,217 || 76–48
|- style="background:#bfb;"
| 125 || August 25 || @ Athletics || 13–4 || Taillon (12–4) || Kaprielian (3–8) || — || Oakland Coliseum || 10,876 || 77–48
|- style="background:#bfb;"
| 126 || August 26 || @ Athletics || 3–2 || Cole (10–6) || Sears (5–1) || Peralta (3) || Oakland Coliseum || 16,821 || 78–48
|- style="background:#fbb;"
| 127 || August 27 || @ Athletics || 2–3  || Payamps (3–3) || Trivino (2–8) || — || Oakland Coliseum || 36,529 || 78–49
|- style="background:#fbb;" 
| 128 || August 28 || @ Athletics || 1–4 || Martínez (3–3) || Schmidt (5–3) || Puk (4) || Oakland Coliseum || 29,498 || 78–50
|- style="background:#fbb;"
| 129 || August 29 || @ Angels || 3–4 || Suárez (5–6) || Montas (4–11) || Herget (4) || Angel Stadium || 44,537 || 78–51
|- style="background:#bfb;"
| 130 || August 30 || @ Angels || 7–4 || Weissert (1–0) || Mayers (1–1) || — || Angel Stadium || 42,684 || 79–51
|- style="background:#fbb;"
| 131 || August 31 || @ Angels || 2–3 || Sandoval (5–9) || Cole (10–7) || Herget (5) || Angel Stadium || 43,555 || 79–52
|-

 
|- style="background:#fbb;" 
| 132 || September 2 || @ Rays || 0–9 || Springs (7–4) || Germán (2–3) || — || Tropicana Field || 17,886 || 79–53
|- style="background:#fbb;"
| 133 || September 3 || @ Rays || 1–2 || Kluber (10–7) || Schmidt (5–4) || Adam (8) || Tropicana Field || 21,754 || 79–54
|- style="background:#bfb;"
| 134 || September 4 || @ Rays || 2–1 || Montas (5–11) || Armstrong (2–2) || Holmes (18) || Tropicana Field || 25,025 || 80–54
|- style="background:#bfb;" 
| 135 || September 5 || Twins || 5–2 || Weissert (2–0) || Megill (3–2) || Holmes (19) || Yankee Stadium || 38,446 || 81–54
|- style="background:#bbb;" 
| — || September 6 || Twins || colspan=7 | Postponed (rain); Makeup: September 7
|- style="background:#bfb;" 
| 136 || September 7  || Twins || 5–4  || Weissert (3–0) || Megill (3–3) || — || Yankee Stadium ||  || 82–54
|- style="background:#bfb;"
| 137 || September 7  || Twins || 7–1 || Cole (11−7) || Ryan (10−8) || Luetge (2) || Yankee Stadium || 30,157 || 83–54
|- style="background:#fbb;"
| 138 || September 8 || Twins || 3–4 || Jax (6−3) || Peralta (2−4) || Fulmer (3) || Yankee Stadium || 35,551 || 83–55
|- style="background:#fbb;"
| 139 || September 9 || Rays || 2–4 || Rasmussen (10–4) || Montas (5–12) || Armstrong (2) || Yankee Stadium || 46,160 || 83–56
|- style="background:#bfb;"
| 140 || September 10 || Rays || 10–3 || Taillon (13–4) || Kluber (10–8) || — || Yankee Stadium || 43,088 || 84–56
|- style="background:#bfb;" 
| 141 || September 11 || Rays || 10–4 || Peralta (3–4) || Patiño (1–2) || — || Yankee Stadium || 36,402 || 85–56
|- style="background:#bfb;" 
| 142 || September 13 || @ Red Sox || 7–6  || Holmes (6–3) || Familia (2–3) || Peralta (4) || Fenway Park || 34,250 || 86–56
|- style="background:#bfb;"
| 143 || September 14 || @ Red Sox || 5–3 || Cortés Jr. (10–4) || Bello (1–6) || Holmes (20) || Fenway Park || 36,581 || 87–56
|- style="background:#fbb;" 
| 144 || September 16 || @ Brewers || 6–7 || Rogers (4–7) || Holmes (6–4) || — || American Family Field || 36,011 || 87–57
|- style="background:#fbb;"
| 145 || September 17 || @ Brewers || 1–4 || Woodruff (11–4) || Taillon (13–5) || Williams (13) || American Family Field || 41,210 || 87–58
|- style="background:#bfb;"
| 146 || September 18 || @ Brewers || 12–8 || Cole (12–7) || Milner (3–3) || — || American Family Field || 35,964 || 88–58
|- style="background:#bfb;"
| 147 || September 20 || Pirates || 9–8 || Chapman (3–3) || Crowe (5–10) || — || Yankee Stadium || 40,157 || 89–58
|- style="background:#bfb;" 
| 148 || September 21 || Pirates || 14–2 || Severino (6–3) || Contreras (5–5) || — || Yankee Stadium || 46,175 || 90–58
|- style="background:#bfb;" 
| 149 || September 22 || Red Sox || 5–4  || Holmes (7–4) || Ort (1–2) || — || Yankee Stadium || 43,123 || 91–58
|- style="background:#bfb;" 
| 150 || September 23 || Red Sox || 5–4 || Loáisiga (2–3) || Strahm (3–4) || — || Yankee Stadium || 47,346 || 92–58
|- style="background:#bfb;"
| 151 || September 24 || Red Sox || 7–5 || Luetge (4–4) || Schreiber (3–4) || Effross (3) || Yankee Stadium || 47,611 || 93–58
|- style="background:#bfb;" 
| 152 || September 25 || Red Sox || 2–0  || Cortés Jr. (11–4) || Bello (2–7) || — || Yankee Stadium || 46,707 || 94–58
|- style="background:#fbb;" 
| 153 || September 26 || @ Blue Jays || 2–3  || Mayza (8–0) || Schmidt (5–5) || — || Rogers Centre || 34,307 || 94–59
|- style="background:#bfb;" 
| 154 || September 27 || @ Blue Jays || 5–2 || Taillon (14–5) || Berríos (11–7) || Trivino (11) || Rogers Centre || 40,528 || 95–59
|- style="background:#bfb;"
| 155 || September 28 || @ Blue Jays || 8–3 || Cole (13–7) || Mayza (8–1) || — || Rogers Centre || 37,008 || 96–59
|- style="background:#fbb;" 
| 156 || September 30 || Orioles || 1–2 || Lyles (12–11) || Germán (2–4) || Hall (1) || Yankee Stadium || 47,583 || 96–60
|-

 
|- style="background:#bfb;" 
| 157 || October 1 || Orioles || 8–0 || Cortés Jr. (12–4) || Voth (5–4) || — || Yankee Stadium || 45,428 || 97–60
|- style="background:#fbb;" 
| 158 || October 2 || Orioles || 1–3 || Gillaspie (1–0) || Chapman (3–4) || Tate (5) || Yankee Stadium || 44,332 || 97–61
|- style="background:#bfb;"
| 159 || October 3 || @ Rangers || 3–1 || Severino (7–3) || Pérez (12–8) || Effross (4) || Globe Life Field || 35,906 || 98–61
|- style="background:#bfb;"
| 160 || October 4  || @ Rangers || 5–4 || Chapman (4–4) || Burke (7–5) || Loáisiga (2) || Globe Life Field || 30,553 || 99–61
|- style="background:#fbb;" 
| 161 || October 4  || @ Rangers || 2–3 || Allard (1–2) || Cole (13–8) || Moore (4) || Globe Life Field || 38,832 || 99–62
|- style="background:#fbb;"
| 162 || October 5 || @ Rangers || 2–4 || Otto (7–10) || Germán (2–5) || Moore (5) || Globe Life Field || 28,056 || 99–63
|-

Postseason

Postseason game log

|- style="background:#bfb;"
| 1 || October 11 || Guardians || Yankee Stadium || 4–1 || Cole (1−0) || Quantrill (0−1) || — || 47,807 || 1–0 
|- style="background:#bbb;" 
| — || October 13 || Guardians || colspan=7| Postponed (rain); Makeup October 14
|- style="background:#fbb;"
| 2 || October 14 || Guardians || Yankee Stadium || 2–4  || Clase (1–0) || Taillon (0–1) || — || 47,535 || 1–1 
|- style="background:#fbb;"
| 3 || October 15 || @ Guardians || Progressive Field || 5–6 || Morgan (1–0) || Schmidt (0–1) || — || 36,483 || 1–2 
|- style="background:#bfb;"
| 4 || October 16 || @ Guardians || Progressive Field || 4–2 || Cole (2–0) || Quantrill (0–2) || Peralta (1) || 36,728 || 2–2 
|- style="background:#bbb;"  
| — || October 17 || Guardians || colspan=7| Postponed (rain); Makeup October 18
|- style="background:#bfb;"
| 5 || October 18 || Guardians || Yankee Stadium || 5–1 || Cortés Jr. (1–0) || Civale (0–1) || — || 48,178 || 3–2 
|- 

|- style="background:#fbb;"
| 1 || October 19 || @ Astros || Minute Maid Park || 2–4 || Verlander (1–0) || Schmidt (0–2) || Pressly (2) || 41,487 || 0–1
|- style="background:#fbb;"
| 2 || October 20 || @ Astros || Minute Maid Park || 2–3 || Valdez (1–0) || Severino (0–1) || Pressly (3) || 41,700 || 0–2
|- style="background:#fbb;" 
| 3 || October 22 || Astros || Yankee Stadium || 0–5 || Javier (1–0) || Cole (2–1) || — || 47,569 || 0–3
|- style="background:#fbb;" 
| 4 || October 23 || Astros || Yankee Stadium || 5–6 || Neris (2–0) || Loáisiga (0–1) || Pressly (4) || 46,545 || 0–4
|-

Postseason rosters

| style="text-align:left" |
Pitchers: 30 Miguel Castro 35 Clay Holmes 40 Luis Severino 43 Jonathan Loáisiga 45 Gerrit Cole 50 Jameson Taillon 55 Domingo Germán 56 Lou Trivino 58 Wandy Peralta 63 Lucas Luetge 65 Nestor Cortés Jr. 86 Clarke Schmidt 
Catchers: 39 Jose Trevino 66 Kyle Higashioka 
Infielders: 12 Isiah Kiner-Falefa 14 Marwin González 24 Matt Carpenter 25 Gleyber Torres 28 Josh Donaldson 48 Anthony Rizzo 
Outfielders: 22 Harrison Bader 31 Aaron Hicks 33 Tim Locastro 95 Oswaldo Cabrera 99 Aaron Judge 
Designated hitters: 27 Giancarlo Stanton 
|- valign="top"

| style="text-align:left" |
Pitchers: 30 Miguel Castro 35 Clay Holmes 40 Luis Severino 43 Jonathan Loáisiga 45 Gerrit Cole 47 Frankie Montas 50 Jameson Taillon 55 Domingo Germán 56 Lou Trivino 58 Wandy Peralta 65 Nestor Cortés Jr. 85 Greg Weissert 86 Clarke Schmidt
Catchers: 39 Jose Trevino 66 Kyle Higashioka
Infielders: 12 Isiah Kiner-Falefa 24 Matt Carpenter 25 Gleyber Torres 28 Josh Donaldson 48 Anthony Rizzo 91 Oswald Peraza
Outfielders: 22 Harrison Bader 33 Tim Locastro 95 Oswaldo Cabrera 99 Aaron Judge
Designated hitters: 27 Giancarlo Stanton
|- valign="top"

Player stats
(Updated as of October 5)

Batting

Note: G = Games played; AB = At bats; R = Runs; H = Hits; 2B = Doubles; 3B = Triples; HR = Home runs; RBI = Runs batted in; AVG = Batting average; SB = Stolen bases

Pitching
Note: W = Wins; L = Losses; ERA = Earned run average; G = Games pitched; GS = Games started; SV = Saves; IP = Innings pitched; H = Hits allowed; R = Total runs allowed; ER = Earned runs allowed; BB = Walks allowed; K = Strikeouts

Roster

Farm system

References

External links
2022 New York Yankees season at Baseball Reference
2022 New York Yankees schedule

New York Yankees seasons
New York Yankees
New York Yankees
2020s in the Bronx
American League East champion seasons